Mogens Berg (born 8 June 1944) is a Danish former footballer, who played professionally as a winger for Scottish club Dundee United. He played eight games and scored one goal for the Denmark national football team.

Career
Born in Odense, Berg started his career with local club Boldklubben 1909 (B 1909). He helped B 1909 win the 1962 Danish Cup and 1964 Danish football championship trophies, and made his Danish national team debut in November 1964. He debuted under national manager Poul Petersen, and scored a goal as Denmark lost 2-4 to Greece. He played a further two national team games, before he moved abroad to play professionally for Dundee United in December 1964.

Due to the Danish rules of amateurism, Berg's national team career then went on a hiatus. Berg played for Dundee United at Tannadice for more than three years, before returning to play for B 1909 in May 1968. Unfortunately, a back injury impacted his time at United, but still he scored 16 goals in 61 appearances, including a hat-trick against St Johnstone during the clubs run to the final of the 1964 Summer Cup.  Dundee United have described Berg as a player who was a "fans favourite" during his time at the club and also as a "club legend". Mor than 50 years after leaving United, Berg returned to Tannadice in September 2019 and was presented to the club's fans ahead of a home game against Morton.  He re-entered the Danish national team in May 1971, as he helped B 1909 win the 1971 Danish Cup. Mogens Berg played five national team games under national manager Rudi Strittich, before his national career ended in June 1971.

Honours
Danish Cup:
Winner (2): 1962, 1971
Danish Championship:
Winner (1):  1964

References

External links
Danish national team profile

1944 births
Living people
Danish men's footballers
Dundee United F.C. players
Dallas Tornado players
United Soccer Association players
Denmark international footballers
Footballers from Odense
Association football wingers
Danish expatriate men's footballers
Expatriate footballers in Scotland
Expatriate soccer players in the United States
Scottish Football League players
Danish expatriate sportspeople in Scotland
Danish expatriate sportspeople in the United States